Yang Chen (born 17 January 1974) is a Chinese football coach and a former player.

As a player he represented Beijing Guoan, Waldhof Mannheim, Eintracht Frankfurt, FC St. Pauli, Shenzhen Jianlibao and Xiamen Blue Lions. He is the first Chinese player to play and score in the Bundesliga while internationally he represented the China football team in the 2002 FIFA World Cup.

Club career
Born in Beijing, Yang began his professional football career with Beijing Guoan. He gradually established himself within their team during his time with them, however it was only once he had a short loan period with lower league German Waldhof Mannheim in 1998 did he show his potential as a forward. This saw Bundesliga side Eintracht Frankfurt interested in him and were willing to make a transfer of DEM1 million for his services. Being the first Chinese footballer to play in the Bundesliga he would personally thrive within the league and score eight goals to help the team avoid relegation to 2. Bundesliga. Yang Chen would go on to be viewed as a trailblazer for Chinese footballers for his ability to score in one of the five major European football leagues and would personally go on to win the Chinese Footballer of the Year in 2000. While his time with Frankfurt was viewed as a success when new manager Felix Magath came in during the 2000–01 season Yang Chen did lose favour within the team and would have to fight back for his position before deciding to move to 2. Bundesliga team FC St. Pauli to ensure his place within the Chinese football team in preparation for the FIFA World Cup.

Yang Chen went back to his home country to play for Shenzhen Jianlibao where under the manager Zhu Guanghu his career would thrive once more and he would go on to win the 2004 Chinese Super League title. Once Zhu Guanghu left to take over the Chinese national team and Chi Shangbin came in to replace him Yang Chen and several other players immediately took a disliking to him. Throughout the 2005 league season there were numerous accusations between the management and the players. The club would decide to let the management go and several players including Yang Chen were sold off. He would go on to join Xiamen Blue Lions until they disbanded in 2007 and he decided to retire.

International career
Yang Chen also played for China at the 2002 FIFA World Cup. He is the Chinese player to have come closest to scoring in the World Cup when his volley ricocheted off the post in the 3–0 loss to Turkey in group stage.

Managerial career
In 2009, Yang obtained his coaching certificate and joined top-tier club Jiangsu Sainty as an assistant coach. In 2010 he would leave the club to go back to Germany to study and complete his international A-level coaching badges before returning to Jiangsu Sainty as an assistant coach and team leader under Dragan Okuka.

In December 2013, Yang joined Guizhou Renhe as an assistant coach and team leader, however he decided to leave them in January 2015 when he accepted the invitation of returning to his hometown of Beijing to join Beijing Enterprises Group to become their guidetrainer and an assistant coach.

In April 2021, Yang was named as head coach of China U-16.

Career statistics
Scores and results list China's goal tally first, score column indicates score after each Chen goal.

Honours
Shenzhen Jianlibao
Chinese Super League: 2004

Filmography

Variety shows

References

External links 
 
 2002 World Cup profile at BBC

1974 births
Living people
Chinese footballers
Footballers from Beijing
Association football forwards
Association football midfielders
China international footballers
2002 FIFA World Cup players
2000 AFC Asian Cup players
Asian Games medalists in football
Footballers at the 1998 Asian Games
Asian Games bronze medalists for China
Medalists at the 1998 Asian Games
Beijing Guoan F.C. players
Bundesliga players
2. Bundesliga players
Eintracht Frankfurt players
FC St. Pauli players
Shenzhen F.C. players
Xiamen Blue Lions players
Expatriate footballers in Germany
Chinese expatriate sportspeople in Germany
Chinese expatriate footballers
21st-century Chinese people